Desulfovibrio putealis is a bacterium. It is sulfate-reducing. Its cells are motile by means of a polar flagellum and contain desulfoviridin. The type strain is B7-43T (=DSM 16056T =ATCC BAA-905T).

References

Further reading
Staley, James T., et al. "Bergey's manual of systematic bacteriology, vol. 3."Williams and Wilkins, Baltimore, MD (1989): 2250–2251.

External links
LPSN

Type strain of Desulfovibrio putealis at BacDive -  the Bacterial Diversity Metadatabase

Bacteria described in 2005
Desulfovibrio